Margaret Stefana Drower MBE (1911–2012) was a historian of Ancient Near Eastern History and Egyptology. She was awarded the MBE and elected a Fellow of the Society of Antiquaries of London. She wrote the definitive biography of Flinders Petrie.

Early life
Drower was the daughter of Edwin Drower, a British diplomat, and Ethel Stefana Drower, an anthropologist, specialist on the Mandaeans and (under the name E. S. Stevens) a well-published author of romantic novels. She was a student of Flinders Petrie, Margaret Murray and Stephen Glanville, and become one of the first Egyptology graduates from University College London (UCL).

Career
Drower's excavations included Armant with O. H. Myers, Robert Mond and Ali Suefi, and at Amarna with John Pendlebury. Stephen Glanville recommended her for a post in the History department at UCL.

During the Second World War she worked with Freya Stark at the Baghdad Ministry of Information, using her skill as an Arabic speaker. After the war she returned to UCL to become a Reader in Ancient History and developed the Ancient History/Egyptology degree. After her retirement she became a Fellow of UCL and a visiting professor at the Institute of Archaeology.

She contributed to many books, especially the Cambridge Ancient History series, and documentary programmes on the ancient Middle East. Her key work was on the life and correspondence of Flinders Petrie.

Bibliography

References

1911 births
2012 deaths
British women archaeologists
Academics of University College London
British centenarians
Members of the Order of the British Empire
British Egyptologists
Fellows of the Society of Antiquaries of London
Alumni of University College London
Women centenarians
Place of death missing
Place of birth missing
Date of death missing
Date of birth missing
21st-century British historians
20th-century British historians
British women historians